The governor of the United States Virgin Islands is the head of government of the United States Virgin Islands whose responsibilities also include making the annual State of the Territory addresses to the Virgin Islands Legislature, submitting the budget, and ensuring that territory public laws are enforced. The position was created through the passage of the Elective Governor Acts of 1968 which took effect in 1970. Melvin Herbert Evans was the first elected governor.

The following is a list of governors of the United States Virgin Islands. For governors of the territory that is now the U.S. Virgin Islands prior to United States administration (while it was ruled by Denmark as the Danish West Indies), see List of governors of the Danish West Indies.

Appointed governors (1917–1970)

Naval governors (1917–1931)

Civilian governors (1931–1970)

Elected governors (1970–present)
 Parties

Succession

References

External links
Office of the Governor
 National Governors Association: Former Virgin Islands Governors

U.S. Virgin Islands
 
Governor